The meridian 77° east of Greenwich is a line of longitude that extends from the North Pole across the Arctic Ocean, Asia, the Indian Ocean, the Southern Ocean, and Antarctica to the South Pole.

The 77th meridian east forms a great circle with the 103rd meridian west.

It is the most populous meridian on Earth, being home to between 113.8 million and 140.0 million people as of 2019.

From Pole to Pole
Starting at the North Pole and heading south to the South Pole, the 77th meridian east passes through:

{| class="wikitable plainrowheaders"
! scope="col" width="120" | Co-ordinates
! scope="col" | Country, territory or sea
! scope="col" | Notes
|-
| style="background:#b0e0e6;" | 
! scope="row" style="background:#b0e0e6;" | Arctic Ocean
| style="background:#b0e0e6;" |
|-
| style="background:#b0e0e6;" | 
! scope="row" style="background:#b0e0e6;" | Kara Sea
| style="background:#b0e0e6;" |
|-
| 
! scope="row" | 
| Krasnoyarsk Krai — Vize Island
|-valign="top"
| style="background:#b0e0e6;" | 
! scope="row" style="background:#b0e0e6;" | Kara Sea
| style="background:#b0e0e6;" | Passing just east of Vilkitsky Island, Yamalo-Nenets Autonomous Okrug,  Passing just east of Neupokoyeva Island, Yamalo-Nenets Autonomous Okrug, 
|-
| 
! scope="row" | 
| Yamalo-Nenets Autonomous Okrug — Oleniy Island
|-
| style="background:#b0e0e6;" | 
! scope="row" style="background:#b0e0e6;" | Yuratski Bay
| style="background:#b0e0e6;" |
|-
| 
! scope="row" | 
| Yamalo-Nenets Autonomous Okrug — Gydan Peninsula
|-
| style="background:#b0e0e6;" | 
! scope="row" style="background:#b0e0e6;" | Khalmyer Bay
| style="background:#b0e0e6;" |
|-
| 
! scope="row" | 
| Yamalo-Nenets Autonomous Okrug — Gydan Peninsula
|-
| style="background:#b0e0e6;" | 
! scope="row" style="background:#b0e0e6;" | Taz Estuary
| style="background:#b0e0e6;" |
|-valign="top"
| 
! scope="row" | 
| Yamalo-Nenets Autonomous Okrug Khanty-Mansi Autonomous Okrug — from  Tomsk Oblast — from  Novosibirsk Oblast — from 
|-valign="top"
| 
! scope="row" | 
| Passing through Lake Balkhash Passing just east of Almaty
|-
| 
! scope="row" | 
| Passing through Issyk Kul lake
|-valign="top"
| 
! scope="row" | 
| Xinjiang
|-
| 
! scope="row" | 
| Gilgit-Baltistan — claimed by 
|-valign="top"
| 
! scope="row" | 
|-
| style="background:#b0e0e6;" | 
! scope="row" style="background:#b0e0e6;" | Indian Ocean
| style="background:#b0e0e6;" |
|-
| style="background:#b0e0e6;" | 
! scope="row" style="background:#b0e0e6;" | Southern Ocean
| style="background:#b0e0e6;" |
|-
| 
! scope="row" | Antarctica
| Australian Antarctic Territory, claimed by 
|-
|}

See also
76th meridian east
78th meridian east

References

e077 meridian east